The Three Men and a Baby franchise consists of American family-comedies produced by various studios of The Walt Disney Company, including two theatrical films, one television series adaptation, and one upcoming reboot film. Based on the script co-written by Jim Cruickshank & James Orr, which was based on the premise of the 1987 French movie. The plot centers around three best friends, who happily live their lives as single men, until a baby girl is left at their door. The individual installments detail their individual journeys, overcoming their personal desires to become effective selfless parents to the child.

The first film was a mostly positive critical hit, and was deemed a box office success as it made the most money of any film in 1987. Conversely, its sequel was met with poor critical and financial reception with its perceived inferiority to its predecessor. The films have since received nostalgic retrospective appreciation, with some modern day critics classifying them as films with a cult following. The TV show was met with mixed reception from critics, though it gained a following with its viewers.

The franchise will continue, with as-of-yet untitled reboot in development, as a streaming exclusive film for Disney+.

Origin 
The Three Men and a Baby franchise is based on the 1987 French independent comedy titled, Trois Hommes Et Un Couffin (Three Men and a Cradle), written and directed by Coline Serreau. Distributed by Acteurs Auteurs Associés, the plot similarly deals with three friends, albeit college-aged young men roommates who discover a baby at their dorm-room doorstep.

The plot follows their interactions with a drug mob, local police department, schooling, and their attempts to raise the child. The basic plot similarities differ greatly in their delivery, with the Hollywood adaptation and its franchise that followed taking an optimistic outlook on parenthood, as opposed to its source material from France. The original film became a Academy Award and Golden Globe nominee for "Best Foreign" film upon its release, and was followed by a sequel in 2003 titled, 18 ans après (18 Years After).

In addition to spawning the American made franchise, it serve as inspiration for a number of foreign adaptations.

Films

Three Men and a Baby (1987)

Three bachelors and best friends including: an architect named Peter Mitchell, a satire author named Michael Kellam, and an actor named Jack Holden live as roommates comfortably in their New York City, New York apartment. Content with their daily routines, the friends frequently engage in reckless behavior, parties, and flings. A sudden change in their respective lives takes place, when a baby girl named Mary is left on their doorstep. Revealed to be the illegitimate daughter from a brief encounter between Jack and a British actress named Sylvia, the three friends struggle to take care of the baby until her mother returns. Seeking to become suitable parent-figures to the abandoned infant, the inexperienced men try to adapt to their new roles but quickly learn that they know a lot less about women than they initially thought. Though they are not sure if the mother will return they do their best through various comedic circumstances and experiences, finding that each of their priorities have changed. Their desire to be a family for Mary, outweigh their personal interests. As a combined unit Peter, Michael, and Jack realize that they love the little girl. As they grow closer, they gain a renewed appreciation for life and their newfound future with Mary. When Sylvia returns, they trio agree to let her to move in on a platonic basis, so that don't miss out on Mary's life.

Three Men and a Little Lady (1990)

Five years later, the three men continue their happy lives as doting father-figures to Mary. Though they are still continuing their bachelor ways, they have let go of some of their more careless habits and activities. Peter, Michael, Jack in addition to doing their best to raise Mary, interact with and co-parent alongside her mother Sylvia who they let live in their apartment. She and Peter have real feelings for each other, though they do not act upon it as he does not vocalize his interest in her. Sylvia reveals her plans to move to England with her daughter, as her new director and recent fiancé named Edward offered her a new business deal. Though she is not particularly romantically interested in him, she accepted his business and marriage proposals since she desires to start a traditional life, get married, and have a family. After Peter expresses his concerns and belief that Edward would not make a good father for Mary, the pair have an argument. Stating that Peter is not Mary's biological father, Sylvia moves away to London the next day with Mary.

Saddened by the events the three friends have a party like they used to, though they find it no longer brings them joy. In low spirits without Mary, they decide to travel to the UK to prove their loyalty to the little girl. Upon arrival Mary is happy to see them, and states that she believes Edward doesn't love her. As the wedding rehearsal commences, the men begin to question Edward's real intentions. Racing against the upcoming wedding date, Peter, Michael, and Jack seek to discover Edward's hidden agenda and win back Sylvia's trust. Given their love for Mary as their daughter, they seek to prove that they can be responsible as a family unit, while Peter tries to find the words to express his love for Sylvia before it's too late.

Future
In June 2010, a third film titled Three Men and a Bride was announced to be in development. Selleck, Guttenberg, and Danson were scheduled to reprise their respective roles from the first two movies. Although the project was still in development, nothing came of the progress and was eventually cancelled.

As of August 2020, a reboot of the franchise was officially greenlit by The Walt Disney Company via Walt Disney Studios Motion Pictures, scheduled to be released as a streaming exclusive film on Disney+. Will Reichel signed on as screenwriter, with Gordon Gray serving as producer. Maurice "Mo" Marable signed onto the project as director. By April 2022, Marable stated that the script is nearing completion. The filmmaker said that the project will pay homage to the originals, while introducing a mixed-race cast. He also intends for the stars of the original films will appear in the film, with a cameo role at minimum. The filmmaker also stated that he hopes to acknowledge the urban legend, of a ghost appearing on screen in the original.

Television 

In February 2012, a television series inspired by and based on the Three Men and a Baby films, entered development. Titled Baby Daddy, the project was announced during a press release by Michael Riley, president of ABC Family. The show was given a series-order after the pilot episode was more well received with test audiences than any other show prior in the network's history. Riley stated that the intention was to develop the series, alongside other projects, into a "engaging, optimistic and relatable" story for its viewers. The series entered production during spring of the same year, and filmed in Los Angeles, California in front of a live audience. Dan Berendsen served as creator, and showrunner, in addition to serving as head writer alongside a writer's room team. Berendsen additionally filled the role as one of the executive producers for the series.

While the plot is similar to the films, there are some plot variations. Centering around a young college-age bachelor named Benjamin "Ben" Wheeler, who works as a bartender in New York. His comfortable life quickly changes when a baby girl named Emma is left on his porch, by his ex-girlfriend. After realizing he loves his daughter, he decides to raise her instead of putting her up for adoption. Together with some help, he experiences the trials of parenthood and must learn the associated responsibilities that come with it. Along the way he has the aid of his mother Bonnie, his brother Daniel, his best friend named Tucker, and a female friend named Riley who is romantically interested in him.

The show culminated with a total of six seasons, and lasted from June 12, 2012, to May 22, 2017. Overall it was met with mixed critical reception, with inferior comparisons to the original films.

Main cast and characters

Additional crew and production details

Reception

Box office and financial performance

Critical and public response 
Though the original films combined received mixed reception initially, they have since been regarded in retrospective analysis as cult classics.

See also
In addition to the original French films of which they are based, other foreign countries also adapted their own versions of the story, including releases in Indian and Turkish cinemas, the prior of which included Marathi cinema, Mollywood, Tollywood, Kollywood, and Bollywood interpretations.

 Baalache Baap Brahmachaari (1989)
 Thoovalsparsham ( Feather touch) (1990)
 Chinnari Muddula Papa ( Cute Lovely Baby) (1990)
 Thayamma ( Mother) (1991)
 Asathal (2001)
 Heyy Babyy (2007)
 Tatlı Bela (2018)

Notes

References 

Film series